Cicerocrinus is an extinct genus of crinoids in the family Pisocrinidae. It is known from the Silurian of the United Kingdom. The type locality for C. elegans is Old Bridge near Ludlow.

See also 
 List of prehistoric echinoderm genera
 List of crinoid genera

References

External links 

 
 Cicerocrinus at fossilworks

Prehistoric crinoid genera
Silurian crinoids
Fossils of Great Britain